Oliver Albert George Ley (born 7 April 1946) is an English former footballer who played professionally in both England and the United States.

Ley played for Exeter City, Portsmouth, Brighton & Hove Albion and Gillingham between 1963 and 1976.
Following his English career, Ley moved to the Dallas Tornado of the North American Soccer League. He was twice named to the NASL All Star second team as a defender. He then moved to the Major Indoor Soccer League and played for the Wichita Wings. In April 1983, the Oklahoma City Slickers of the second division American Soccer League hired Ley as a player-assistant coach.

Following his playing career, Ley turned to coaching. He served as the Luton Town head youth coach under manager Jimmy Ryan. He returned to the United States as the head coach of the USISL Austin Sockadillos. Later, he served as Director of Coaching for the River City Rangers from 1996–2003 in Austin, TX. He also served as Director of Coaching for the Crossfire Soccer Club in Round Rock, TX in 2009 and 2010.

References

External links
NASL/MISL stats
Crossfire SC
PompeyRama profile

1946 births
Living people
American Soccer League (1933–1983) coaches
American Soccer League (1933–1983) players
Brighton & Hove Albion F.C. players
Dallas Tornado players
English footballers
Exeter City F.C. players
Gillingham F.C. players
League of Ireland players
Major Indoor Soccer League (1978–1992) players
North American Soccer League (1968–1984) players
Oklahoma City Slickers (ASL) players
Portsmouth F.C. players
St Patrick's Athletic F.C. players
USISL coaches
Wichita Wings (MISL) players
Association football defenders
Association football midfielders
English expatriate sportspeople in the United States
Expatriate soccer players in the United States
English expatriate footballers
English football managers